Lindsay Davenport and Arantxa Sánchez Vicario were the defending champions, but Sánchez Vicario did not compete this year. Davenport teamed up with Irina Spîrlea and lost in the quarterfinals to Kathy Rinaldi-Stunkel and Jill Hetherington.

Lori McNeil and Helena Suková won the title by defeating Erica Adams and Zina Garrison-Jackson 3–6, 6–4, 6–3 in the final.

Seeds
The first two seeds received a bye to the second round.

Draw

Draw

References

External links
 Official results archive (ITF)
 Official results archive (WTA)

Silicon Valley Classic
1995 WTA Tour